SMS Friedrich Carl was a German armored cruiser built in the early 1900s for the German Kaiserliche Marine (Imperial Navy). Friedrich Carl was built by the Blohm & Voss shipyard in Hamburg. She was laid down in August 1901, launched in June 1902, and commissioned in December 1903.

Friedrich Carl served with the scouting forces of the Active Battle Fleet for the first few years of her career, including a stint as the flagship of the reconnaissance squadron. She went on cruises abroad, including voyages escorting Kaiser Wilhelm II on tours in the Mediterranean Sea. She also participated in extensive training exercises in the Baltic and North Seas. In 1909, she was withdrawn from front-line service and used as a torpedo training ship until 1914.

After the outbreak of World War I in July 1914, Friedrich Carl returned to active service for operations in the Baltic Sea against the Imperial Russian Navy. She served as the flagship of the cruiser squadron in the Baltic and participated in patrols in the Gulf of Finland. The ship was modified to carry a pair of seaplanes. In mid-November, the cruiser squadron was tasked with attacking the Russian base at Libau, but while en route on 17 November, Friedrich Carl struck a pair of naval mines. She remained afloat long enough for most of her crew to be taken off by the light cruiser  before sinking; seven or eight men died as she sank.

Design

The law called for a force of fourteen armored cruisers able to serve in Germany's colonial empire and scout for the main German fleet in home waters. The need for one type of ship to fill both roles was the result of budgetary limitations, which prevented Germany from building vessels specialized to each task. The Prinz Adalbert design was based on the previous armored cruiser, but it incorporated more powerful armament and more comprehensive armor protection.

She displaced  as built and up to  fully loaded. Friedrich Carl was powered by three vertical triple expansion engines driving three screws, steam being generated by fourteen coal-fired water-tube boilers. Her standard crew consisted of 35 officers and 551 enlisted men.

Friedrich Carl was armed with four  SK L/40 guns arranged in two twin gun turrets, one on either end of the superstructure. Her secondary armament consisted of ten  SK L/40 guns mounted in casemates in a two-story arrangement amidships. For defense against torpedo boats, she carried twelve  guns in both single pedestal mounts and casemates. Friedrich Carl was also equipped with four  torpedo tubes submerged below the waterline, one in the bow, one in the stern, and one on each broadside.

The main battery turrets had 150 mm thick sides and the casemate guns were protected with 100 mm of Krupp steel.

Service history

Construction through 1905

Friedrich Carl was ordered under the provisional name Ersatz König Wilhelm and built at the Blohm & Voss shipyard in Hamburg under yard number 155. Her keel was laid down in August 1901 and she was launched on 21 June 1902. At the launching ceremony, Prince Friedrich Leopold of Prussia gave a speech; he was the son of the ship's namesake, Prince Friedrich Carl. Friedrich Leopold's wife, Louise Sophie, christened the ship. Fitting-out work followed, and in November 1903 a shipyard crew began builder's trials before she was moved to Wilhelmshaven to have her artillery installed. Work on the vessel was completed by 12 December 1903, the day she began sea trials; her first commander was Kapitän zur See (KzS—Captain at Sea) Johannes Merten.

The trials were interrupted in March 1904 when Friedrich Carl was tasked with escorting Kaiser Wilhelm II aboard the Norddeutscher Lloyd steamer  on a trip to the Mediterranean Sea. On 12 March the ships left Bremerhaven and steamed to Vigo, Spain, where the Spanish king, Alfonso XIII, visited Friedrich Carl on 15 March. Three days later the ships arrived in Gibraltar, where they met the British Channel Squadron. They then proceeded to Naples, Italy, by way of Mahón, where on 24 March Wilhelm II transferred to his yacht, Hohenzollern. King Victor Emmanuel III of Italy visited Friedrich Carl at Mahón before she, Hohenzollern, and the dispatch boat  began a tour of Mediterranean ports. Friedrich Carl was in need of repairs, so she left Hohenzollern and Sleipner on 26 April and began the voyage back to Germany; she stopped in Venice, Italy, on 7 May and arrived back in Kiel on 17 May. There, she was assigned to the reconnaissance force of the Active Battle Fleet, taking the place of the protected cruiser .

Beginning in June 1904, Friedrich Carl joined II Squadron for a tour of Dutch, British, and Norwegian ports that lasted until August. During the voyage, Friedrich Carl had to tow two torpedo boats in company with the coastal defense ship  and the torpedo boat  to Stavanger, Norway. On returning to Germany, the German fleet conducted its annual maneuvers in August and September in the North and Baltic Seas. Following the conclusion of the maneuvers in September, Merten was replaced as the ship's commander by Fregattenkapitän (FK—Frigate Captain) Hugo von Cotzhausen. The ship's sea trials were also officially ended at this point. In November, the crew briefly staged a mutiny against Cotzhausen, citing his inept leadership, though he remained in command.  (KAdm—Rear Admiral) Gustav Schmidt, who was the commander of reconnaissance forces of the Active Battlefleet, transferred from Prinz Heinrich, making Friedrich Carl the new flagship of the reconnaissance squadron. 

From January to February 1905, Friedrich Carl participated in training exercises in the Baltic. While cruising north of the Great Belt, she struck a submerged shipwreck but suffered no significant damage. Beginning on 23 March, she again accompanied Wilhelm II, who was aboard the HAPAG steamship , for another voyage to the Mediterranean. While the ships were in Lisbon, they were visited by King Carlos I of Portugal. Wilhelm II made a speech supporting Moroccan independence, which led to the First Moroccan Crisis. The following day, the two German vessels steamed to Gibraltar, where Friedrich Carl accidentally collided with the British pre-dreadnought battleship . It is not known if either ship suffered any damage. During the cruise, Schmidt transferred to Prinz Heinrich. On her return to Germany in June, Friedrich Carl resumed her role as flagship, apart from during a maintenance period from 10 to 26 August.

1905–1914

In July, Friedrich Carl joined the rest of the fleet for a cruise in the North and Baltic Seas, during which she ran aground but was not damaged. She then participated in squadron exercises in the Baltic. In February 1906, she went on a training cruise to Denmark. The new armored cruiser  replaced Friedrich Carl as the squadron flagship in late March. Friedrich Carl in turn replaced Prinz Heinrich as the flagship of the deputy commander, Kommodore (Commodore) Raimund Winkler. She remained in this role until the new armored cruiser  took her place on 15 August. The autumn maneuvers of 1906 were conducted in Norwegian waters and the western Baltic. After the maneuvers, FK Franz von Hipper took command of the ship. Friedrich Carl resumed her role as the deputy commander flagship on 31 October when KzS Eugen Kalau vom Hofe came aboard the ship; she held the position until 5 March 1908. The year 1907 passed uneventfully for Friedrich Carl; she briefly served as the squadron flagship from 11 September to 28 October after Yorck suffered an accident. Friedrich Carl went on a major training cruise into the Atlantic Ocean in early 1908 and on her return to Wilhelmshaven was decommissioned on 5 March for lengthy repairs.

On returning to service on 1 March 1909, KzS Friedrich Schultz assumed command of the ship, which was to be used as a torpedo test ship. In this role, she replaced the protected cruiser ; Schultz was also the commander of the Torpedo Testing Inspectorate. On 30 March, Friedrich Carl was assigned to the temporary Training and Testing Ship Unit for maneuvers off the island of Rügen in April. The unit was dissolved on 24 April, and from mid-August to early September, Friedrich Carl participated in the autumn maneuvers as part of the Reconnaissance Group of the Reserve Fleet. The years 1910 and 1911 followed a similar training routine to that of 1909, and Schultz had been replaced by KzS Ernst Ritter von Mann und Edler von Tiechler as the ship's captain in September 1909 and by KAdm Wilhelm von Lans as commander of the Torpedo Testing Inspectorate on 19 December 1909. Tiechler was in turn replaced by FK Andreas Michelsen in September 1911; he held the command until the outbreak of World War I in July 1914.

In July 1911, Friedrich Carl conducted torpedo tests with the light cruiser  in Norwegian waters. The winter of 1911–1912 was particularly severe, and in early 1912 Friedrich Carl was used to rescue merchant ships that had been trapped in the iced-over Baltic. That year, the Training and Testing Ship Unit was reactivated as the Training Squadron for exercises. KAdm Reinhard Koch replaced Lans on 1 October 1912 and kept Friedrich Carl as his flagship. During the autumn maneuvers that year, Friedrich Carl was assigned to II Scouting Group of what was now the High Seas Fleet. The training routine in 1913 and the first half of 1914 followed the same pattern as in previous years. On 6 April 1914, she ran aground off Swinemünde but was pulled free without damage. During the Kiel Week sailing regatta in July 1914, Großadmiral (Grand Admiral) Alfred von Tirpitz came aboard Friedrich Carl to observe the festivities, which coincided with a visit from the British 2nd Battle Squadron. During the visit, British ambassador Edward Goschen visited Tirpitz aboard the ship, when news of the assassination of Archduke Franz Ferdinand arrived. On 31 July, days after Austria-Hungary declared war on Serbia but before Germany entered the war, Friedrich Carl went into drydock at the Kaiserliche Werft (Imperial Shipyard) in Kiel for repairs in preparation for the coming conflict.

World War I

On 28 August 1914, Friedrich Carl returned to service under the command of KzS Max Schlicht; he held the position for just two months before being replaced by FK Loesch. Friedrich Carl was assigned to the Cruiser Division of the Baltic Sea, taking the place of the protected cruiser  and becoming the flagship of KAdm Robert Mischke. In late September, the division supported the laying of a defensive minefield off Langeland. The ship was transferred to the unit commanded by KAdm Ehler Behring, serving as his flagship. The division was based in Neufahrwasser in Danzig. Friedrich Carl took part in a sortie into the Gulf of Finland on 24 October to sweep for Russian warships and British submarines that were operating in the area, though the Germans failed to locate any hostile vessels. By this time, the ship had been modified to carry seaplanes; she carried two planes provisionally and had no permanent modifications made to support them. On 30 October another patrol was carried out, again without success.

In early November, Friedrich Carl was withdrawn for repairs, which were completed by mid-month. In the meantime, the German naval command, which was aware that British submarines were operating in the Baltic Sea, had ordered Behring to attack the Russian port at Libau to prevent it being used as a British submarine base. Friedrich Carl was assigned to the attack force, and she left Memel on 16 November to bombard Russian positions around Libau. The ship's crew initially thought the shock of the explosion was from striking a submarine; Loesch immediately altered course to return to Memel, at which point she struck a second mine at 01:57. She began to take on water, though she remained afloat for some time. At 6:20, Augsburg arrived on the scene and evacuated the crew, and Friedrich Carl was abandoned to sink, which she did at 07:15. Seven or eight men died in the sinking.

Notes

Footnotes

Citations

References

Further reading
 

Prinz Adalbert-class cruisers
Ships built in Hamburg
1902 ships
World War I cruisers of Germany
World War I shipwrecks in the Baltic Sea
Maritime incidents in November 1914
Ships sunk by mines